Chinelle Akhalia Henry (born 17 August 1995) is a Jamaican cricketer who plays as a right-arm medium-fast bowler and right-handed batter. In October 2018, she was named in the West Indies' squad for the 2018 ICC Women's World Twenty20 tournament in the West Indies. In July 2019, Cricket West Indies awarded her with a central contract for the first time, ahead of the 2019–20 season. In January 2020, she was named in West Indies' squad for the 2020 ICC Women's T20 World Cup in Australia. In May 2021, Henry was awarded with a central contract from Cricket West Indies. She plays domestic cricket for Jamaica and Barbados Royals.

On 2 July 2021, she and her fellow teammate Chedean Nation had collapsed on the field in a space of ten minutes during the second women's T20I match between West Indies and Pakistan at the Coolidge Cricket Ground in Antigua. Both of them were immediately taken to the hospital and they were reportedly in conscious and stable position.

In October 2021, she was named in the West Indies team for the 2021 Women's Cricket World Cup Qualifier tournament in Zimbabwe. In February 2022, she was named in the West Indies team for the 2022 Women's Cricket World Cup in New Zealand.

References

External links

1995 births
Living people
Jamaican women cricketers
West Indies women One Day International cricketers
West Indies women Twenty20 International cricketers
West Indian women cricketers
Barbados Royals (WCPL) cricketers